Jonathan B. Jarvis (born June 26, 1953) served as the 18th Director of the United States National Park Service, confirmed by the United States Senate on September 25, 2009, and serving until his retirement on January 3, 2017.

Early life and education
Jarvis graduated from Natural Bridge High School in Natural Bridge Station, Virginia, in 1971.

He graduated from The College of William & Mary in 1975 with a degree in biology. He was a member of the Sigma Chi fraternity.

From 1971 to 1975, he was a maintenance mechanic and welder at the Blue Bird bus company.

Parks career

Jarvis became a park ranger in 1976, at the National Mall and Memorial Parks.

Jarvis served for three years as the superintendent of Mount Rainier National Park in Ashford, Washington. He was superintendent of Craters of the Moon National Monument and Preserve in Idaho and Wrangell-St. Elias National Park & Preserve in Alaska during the 1990s.

Directorship 
Jarvis was serving as regional director for the Pacific West Region when, on July 10, 2009, President Barack Obama nominated Jarvis for the directorship following the resignation of Mary A. Bomar on January 20, 2009, the day of President Obama's inauguration. A career civil servant, Jarvis had been with the service for over 30 years.

Jarvis wrote in 2010 that climate change is "fundamentally the greatest threat to the integrity of our national parks that we have ever experienced."

In 2013, Jarvis unveiled new guidelines for healthier food at national parks. In 2014, Jarvis banned the flying of drones over national parks. Jarvis pledged to remove Confederate flag merchandise from park bookstores and gift shops in 2015 after the massacre of nine black people by a white gunman at a church in Charleston, South Carolina. In 2015, Jarvis signed an agreement for a new Manhattan Project National Historical Park at the historic nuclear reactor in Hanford, Washington. In 2016, the Park Service under Jarvis unveiled the Stonewall National Monument in New York City, commemorating the Stonewall Riots for gay rights.

In his time as Park Service director, Jarvis faced criticism from Congress and watchdog organizations, claiming his oversight of the service failed to address a culture of sexual harassment, bullying, and park mismanagement. In 2016 he was reprimanded for violating ethics standards after publishing an unauthorized book with a nonprofit group that operated stores in national parks.

Jarvis retired from his position on January 3, 2017. He was immediately succeeded by Michael T. Reynolds, who was appointed as acting director.

Later work 
On October 24, 2017, Jarvis was appointed as the executive director of UC Berkeley's Institute for Parks, People, and Diversity.

In 2018 University of Chicago Press published a book co-authored by Jarvis, The Future of Conservation in America: A Chart for Rough Water.

Jarvis endorsed Joe Biden in the 2020 presidential election.

References

External links
 

1953 births
Living people
College of William & Mary alumni
Directors of the National Park Service
Obama administration personnel
University of California, Berkeley people